The  is a railway line in Japan operated by the major private railway operator Tobu Railway. The line is a  branch off the Isesaki Line at Ōta Station, southbound to Akagi Station.

Operation

Stations
All stations are located in Gunma Prefecture.
Limited express Ryomo stops at stations marked ● and passes stations marked │.

History
The Yabuzuka Quarry opened a  gauge handcar line between Ota and Yabuzuka in 1911 to haul stone blocks. The line was acquired by Tobu in March 1913, rebuilt to  gauge and extended to Aioi on 19 March 1913, operating using steam haulage. The line was electrified at 1,500 V DC from 1 March 1928, and in March 1932 extended to Akagi. Freight services ceased in 1996, with the last service running on 25 September.

See also
 List of railway lines in Japan

References
This article incorporates material from the corresponding article in the Japanese Wikipedia.

External links

 Tobu Railway Kiryu Line information page 

Kiryu Line
Rail transport in Gunma Prefecture
Railway lines opened in 1911
1067 mm gauge railways in Japan
1911 establishments in Japan